Darragh Mortell (born 23 June 1989) is a Welsh actor, writer, and director of television, radio and film. He began his career as a child actor starring in television shows such as Dani's House, Diddy TV and most notably, The Story of Tracy Beaker. He also appeared as the guest lead in the final episodes of The Bill as well as groundbreaking interactive drama Dubplate Drama, DCI Banks and Hollyoaks Later.

Darragh's debut short film as a writer and director, Peep Dish (2015), won the Best Experimental Short Film prize at the London Independent Film Festival. His second, Donald Mohammed Trump, starring Asim Chaudhry and Holli Dempsey, garnered international praise and a screening at London's BFI Southbank.

In 2020, Darragh won 'Best European Fiction' at the Prix Europa Awards for his BBC Radio Wales / BBC Radio 4 afternoon play I am Kanye West. The play explores the themes of identity, celebrity obsession and mental health, themes that arise often in Darragh's work. In the same year, he served as Second Unit Director for the Mark Rylance-led feature film The Fantastic Flitcrofts, slated for a 2021 release.

Darragh is a proud Welshman of Irish and Zimbabwean heritage and cites the notion of existing between two worlds as inspiration for many of his works. He is represented by London-based talent agency Curtis Brown.

References

External links

1989 births
Living people
People from Newport, Wales
21st-century Welsh male actors
Welsh film directors
Welsh male child actors
Welsh male film actors
Welsh male television actors
Welsh people of Irish descent
Welsh people of Zimbabwean descent
Welsh radio writers